Penicillium pimiteouiense is a species of fungus in the genus Penicillium which was isolated from sandy beach soil from the Penang Island in Peninsular Malaysia.

References

Further reading 
 

pimiteouiense
Fungi described in 1999